Rainbow City is a census-designated place in Navajo County, in the U.S. state of Arizona, on the Fort Apache Indian Reservation. The population was 968 at the 2010 census.

Demographics

As of the census of 2010, there were 968 people, 223 households, and 192 families living in the CDP.

References

Census-designated places in Navajo County, Arizona
White Mountain Apache Tribe